Paul Smith (born November 18 1961) is a British television writer who was born and lives in London.

Smith's four-part BBC1 drama One Night (executive producer Hilary Salmon) won the Reflet D'Or for Best Drama Series at the 2012 Festival Tous Ecrans as well as making the official selection for FIPA Biarritz. Lead writer on Jam Media/CBBC's pioneering live action/animation series ROY (RTS Award for Best Children's Drama 2010, two 2011 BAFTA nominations, including Writers' Award), Smith also wrote ten-part CBBC teen drama series Desperados (Prix Jeunesse 2008), about a junior wheelchair basketball team. He has also written two BBC1 Afternoon Plays – Tea with Betty starring Rosemary Leach as Queen Elizabeth II and Death Becomes Him.  His other recent work includes ITV1 comedy drama The Complete Guide to Parenting starring Peter Davison (British Comedy Guide Editors' Award), the Sunday serial dramatisation of Bootleg (BAFTA Children's Drama Award) and BBC1 children's thriller series Oscar Charlie. Further credits include Murder Most Horrid (British Comedy Award and starring Dawn French), Grange Hill, Brittas Empire, Spitting Image, Alas Smith and Jones; and, with Terry Kyan, Colin's Sandwich (two series starring Mel Smith) and About Face, starring Maureen Lipman

Smith is married to Eve Murray who works for the British Museum and GlobeScan – they have two children, Daniel and Emma.

Writing credits

Awards and nominations

References
General
Interview with Paul Smith writer of drama serial One Night
BBC Press Release 2011 – new six-part drama series One Night
BBC News Announcement 2008 – Desperados
BBC Murder Most Horrid – TV Comedy

Specific

External links

British television writers
Living people
1961 births